Neil Selkirk  (born June 25, 1947) is a British-born American photographer known for his portraiture.

Photography career
Selkirk was born in London, England, in 1947. “An accomplished portrait photographer and masterful documentarian,” he studied Photography at the London College of Printing and graduated in 1968. He won a British Arts Council award to photograph New York and therefore moved to New York City in 1970. There, he worked as an assistant for photographer Hiro at the studio of Richard Avedon. The following year, he studied with photographer Diane Arbus in her master class. His photographs quickly drew assignments from major magazines including Esquire, The New York Times Magazine, Interview, Vanity Fair, The New Yorker, and the premier issues of Wired, Paper, Colors , and Spy.

By the 1990s, Selkirk was known as a portraitist with a distinctive style. In August 1993, the photographs from his limited edition portfolio were featured in the Minneapolis Institute of Art exhibition, 3 Photographers, and 3 Portfolios along with the work of Diane Arbus and Richard Avedon.

His photographs are in the permanent collections of the Metropolitan Museum of Art in New York, Minneapolis Institute of Art, Museum of Fine Arts in Houston, and other major U.S. institutions.

Selkirk is the only person ever authorized to make posthumous prints of the work of Diane Arbus. In an article for iPhoto Newsletter, Jeffrey Fraenkel stated that the process by which Selkirk came to make these prints and the arduous decisions that went into their making are thoroughly detailed in his essay "In the Darkroom" (pp. 266–275 of Diane Arbus Revelations). Selkirk described his first encounter with an Arbus photograph in a radio interview on Kurt Andersen’s Studio 360 series, “The Aha Moment.”

In 2005, Selkirk directed the documentary film, Who is Marvin Israel, about Marvin Israel (1924-1984), an artist, designer, art director and teacher, who influenced many of the important photographers and designers of the twentieth century, including Richard Avedon and Diane Arbus, as well as Selkirk himself. The film, which premiered at the Metropolitan Museum of Art in New York and aired on the Documentary Channel, explores Israel's life and work through the words of those who knew him.

Selkirk's recent project, Certain Women, was on display from March 19 to May 2, 2015, at the Howard Greenberg Gallery in New York City. “The series has taken Selkirk far afield from that for which he’s best known: frank portraits of celebrated authors, filmmakers, statesmen, athletes, and their recognizable ilk, which he has shot since the 1970s for Esquire (where he got his start under Jean-Paul Goude), Vanity Fair, The New Yorker, and many other publications. He has also produced a strong body of documentary and street photography that reflects his having studied with Diane Arbus and worked in the studio of Richard Avedon.” 

About the project, Selkirk said in an interview with the Los Angeles Review of Books, "Motherhood leaves its mark. And I think that one of the things that the whole project suggests is that maybe it's a really nice mark and something to be proud of. The sort of strength that I thought I saw, that I was looking for, that I was hoping to record is just this knowingness. When you start talking nonsense it’s like they see it instantly."

Publications

Publications by Selkirk
See No Evil. Tucson: Nazraeli Press, 2006. .
Lobbyists. Tucson: Nazraeli Press, 2006. .
Certain Women. New York: Howard Greenberg, 2015. Exhibition catalog.

Publications with contributions by Selkirk
Infra-Apparel by Richard Martin and Harold Koda. New York: Metropolitan Museum of Art, 1993. . Photography by Selkirk.
1000 on 42nd Street by Tibor Kalman and Maira Kalman. New York: powerHouse Books, 1999. . Photography by Selkirk.
“In the Darkroom,” in Diane Arbus Revelations by Diane Arbus, Sandra S. Phillips, Selkirk, Elizabeth Sussman, Doon Arbus, and Jeff L. Rosenheim. New York: Random House, 2003. .

References

External links

 

American photographers
Living people
1947 births
Photographers from London
British emigrants to the United States